George Hunter (30 January 1939 – 11 May 1999) was a motorcycle speedway rider. He rode for the Edinburgh Monarchs and the Wolverhampton Wolves.

Career
Hunter's early career was on grass. He joined Motherwell Speedway team in 1958 and moved to Edinburgh Monarchs in 1960. Known as the "Ladybank Express", he rode in 360 league matches for the Monarchs over his lifetime career.

In 1963 he was leading the 1962 world champion Peter Craven in the final race of a challenge match between Edinburgh and Belle Vue at Old Meadowbank when his engine seized. After taking evasive action Craven may have clipped Hunter's wheel before crashing through the fence and suffering fatal injuries. 

Hunter narrowly missed out on being the 1963 Provincial League Riders Champion, suffering an engine failure while leading in the final. Ivan Mauger took the title.

Hunter was a British Finalist in 1966, 1967 and 1976.
17 England Caps
3 Scotland Caps
16 GB Caps

Having been part of the Midland Cup winning Wolverhampton Wolves in 1973, he might have expected to win it again in 1975 when Wolves only lost to Oxford Rebels by 2 points away and might have expected to win at home and thereby win on aggregate. However, George was not present for the second leg at Monmore Green, Wolves lost at home by 1 point and on aggregate by 3.

He retired in 1983.

Personal life
Hunter was born in Ladybank, Fife, Scotland. He and his wife, Barbara, have a daughter, Natalie. Also two children Scott and Gillian from his first marriage. He died of cancer in 1999.

World Final appearances

World Pairs Championship
 1971 -  Rybnik, Rybnik Municipal Stadium (with Jim McMillan) - 5th - 16pts (5)
 1976 -  Eskilstuna, Eskilstuna Motorstadion (with Jim McMillan) - 6th - 12pts (2)

References

External links
http://www.edinburghmonarchs.co/club_legends/article.asp?id=16 
https://archive.today/20140623101137/http://www.jglowe.pwp.blueyonder.co.uk/Archives/Oldnews/news178.htm
http://wwosbackup.proboards.com/thread/1222

Wolverhampton Wolves riders
Edinburgh Monarchs riders
Newcastle Diamonds riders
Glasgow Tigers riders
Oxford Cheetahs riders
Berwick Bandits riders
British speedway riders
Scottish speedway riders
1939 births
1999 deaths